Cecil William "C. W." Bishop (June 29, 1890 – September 21, 1971) was a member of the United States House of Representatives from Illinois.

Biography
Bishop was born on a farm near West Vienna, Illinois. After attending the public schools and Union Academy in Anna, Illinois, he became a tailor. As quarterback on an elementary school football team he weighed less than 90 pounds, giving rise to the nickname "Runt."

Bishop was engaged in the cleaning and tailoring business from 1910 to 1922. He later worked as a coal miner, a telephone lineman, and a player for and manager of professional football and baseball teams. He became city clerk of Carterville, Illinois in 1915, and served until 1918. He was town postmaster from 1923 to 1933.

Bishop was elected as a Republican to the Seventy-seventh Congress and to six succeeding Congresses, serving from January 3, 1941 to January 3, 1955. He served as chairman of the Special Committee on Campaign Expenditures in the Eighty-third Congress. He ran unsuccessfully for reelection to the Eighty-fourth Congress in 1954, and was succeeded by Kenneth J. Gray.

After serving in Congress, Bishop held several other offices, including: Congressional liaison assistant, Post Office Department, from 1955 to 1957. Superintendent, Division of Industrial Planning and Development, State of Illinois, in 1957 and 1958. Department of Labor conciliator for the State of Illinois from 1958 to 1960.

Bishop died in Marion, Illinois on September 21, 1971. He was interred in Oakwood Cemetery in Carterville.

References

External links

1890 births
1971 deaths
People from Union County, Illinois
Illinois postmasters
Republican Party members of the United States House of Representatives from Illinois
American tailors
Burials in Illinois
20th-century American politicians
People from Johnson County, Illinois
People from Carterville, Illinois
City and town clerks